Parliamentary elections were held in Slovakia on 12 June 2010. The elections were contested by eighteen parties, six of which passed the 5% threshold for sitting in parliament. Despite the incumbent Smer of Prime Minister Robert Fico winning a plurality, the new government consisted of a coalition led by the Slovak Democratic and Christian Union – Democratic Party's Iveta Radičová and included KDH, SaS and Most-Hid. However, her government fell on 11 October 2011 following a vote of no confidence with a new election called for 10 March 2012.

Background

A total of 2,401 candidates applied to contest the 150 seats.

Polls in February 2010 had indicated that the current governing party Smer-SD (Direction – Social Democracy) would win a plurality with a margin of 25%. However the five opposition right-wing parties – the Slovak Democratic and Christian Union (SDKÚ-DS), the Christian Democratic Movement (KDH), the Party of the Hungarian Coalition (SMK-MKP), Most–Híd, and Freedom and Solidarity (SaS) – could together gain a majority. There were conflicting reports during the campaign as to whether some of these parties would consider joining with Fico. During pre-election campaigning, reports indicated that the "Christian Democrats and the two ethnic Hungarian parties had not ruled out working with Fico." Rumours were reported that prime minister Robert Fico might have secretly agreed not to enter a coalition with the Slovak nationalists again, unless he had no other choice. A later poll by of the Czech News Agency suggested that the governing coalition would lose its majority, and that one of Fico's allies (HZDS) would struggle with the 5% barrier.

Contesting parties
European Democratic Party
Union – Party for Slovakia
Party of the Roma Coalition
Paliho Kapurková, Cheerful Political Party
Freedom and Solidarity
Party of the Democratic Left
Party of the Hungarian Coalition
People's Party – Movement for a Democratic Slovakia
Communist Party of Slovakia
Slovak National Party
New Democracy
Union of the Workers of Slovakia
Christian Democratic Movement
People's Party – Our Slovakia
Slovak Democratic and Christian Union – Democratic Party
AZEN – Alliance for Europe of the Nations
Direction – Social Democracy
Most–Híd

Campaign
During the parliamentary elections the SDKÚ-DS ran on a platform of fiscal discipline and pledging to reinvigorate the economy.

Opinion polls

According to polling agency Focus in May 2010, eight parties would cross the 5% threshold needed for participation in parliament.

According to a poll of the Institute of public affairs (IVO) the voter participation will be about 50 to 60%.

Results

Results by region

New government
Incumbent Prime Minister Robert Fico's Direction – Social Democracy (Smer) party increased its seat share by 12 to 62.  However, Fico faced an uphill battle to remain prime minister, as his coalition partners were decimated.  The Slovak National Party barely passed the 5% vote threshold required for parliamentary representation while losing 11 of their 20 seats, while the People's Party – Movement for a Democratic Slovakia was shut out of the chamber altogether. Despite the setback, Fico said that he wanted to try to form a cabinet even though his leftist coalition could only command 71 of the 150 parliament seats and would thus force the need for at least one of the opposing centre-right parties. This has been described as an unlikely, but possible, occurrence, because opposition parties stated during the election that they would not enter government with Fico. One analyst said that he "strictly rule[d] out that any of the centre-right parties could team up with Smer."

The Slovakian President, Ivan Gasparovic, asked Fico to attempt to form a government stating that "I believe that the party that won such support from the people deserves the chance."

The second placed Slovak Democratic and Christian Union – Democratic Party had coalition talks with the Christian Democratic Movement, Freedom and Solidarity and Most–Híd. On 16 June it was reported that the four opposition parties which had won seats in the parliament had agreed to form a government under the leadership of Radičová.

An agreement on the distribution of ministries was reached on 28 June 2010. Radičová was then sworn in as PM on 8 July 2010, after her coalition (comprising SDKU, KDH, SaS and Most-Hid) secured a majority of 79 seats in the 150-seat parliament and Fico and his cabinet tendered their resignations. The new government pledged to cut state spending and the budget deficit and to attract more foreign investment, while steering clear of tax rises. "We are ready to take responsibility over the country at a time when it is coping with the impact of a deep economic crisis and the irresponsible decisions of our political predecessors." They have also sought, through Most-Hid, to rebuild links with Hungary that were badly damaged by the adoption of contentious language and citizenship laws.

Fall of government
On 11 October 2011, parliament voted to approve the expansion of the European Financial Stability Fund on the grounds, according to the Freedom and Solidarity, that Slovakia, the second poorest eurozone country, should not bailout richer countries such as Greece and for bank re-capitalisation. As Slovakia was the last eurozone country to vote on the measure, Radičová made it a no confidence vote. The measure then failed by 21 votes after both Freedom and Solidarity and Smer abstained. However, another vote was expected with Smer rumoured to support it should there be a new election and more stringent terms. Smer came to an agreement with the governing coalition to support the measure in what Fico called "the most important document of this period." He also explained the first round rejection of the measure as "saying 'no' to a rightist government, but we're saying 'yes' to the rescue fund." As per the agreement between the two parties Minister Mikulas Dzurinda said that a snap election has been called: "We decided that as the first point of [Thursday's] parliamentary session, we will work on a proposal to shorten the voting period, with the goal of organising an election on 10 March. Immediately after [13 October or 14 October] we will debate proposals related to the EFSF."

Notes

References

External links
Slovak Election Data Project
NSD: European Election Database – Slovakia publishes regional level election data (NUTS 1–3); allows for comparisons of election results, 1990–2010

Parliamentary elections in Slovakia
Slovakia
Parliamentary
Slovakia